A chub or a chub pack is a type of  container formed by a tube of flexible packaging material. The cylindrical package has the appearance of a sausage with the ends sealed by metal crimps or clips.

Uses
Chub packs are used to pack semi-solid materials such as:
 sausage
 hamburger
 dog food
 cheese spreads
 frostings
 bread dough
 cookie dough
 creamed corn
 drywall compound
 explosive slurries

See also
 Tube (container)

Notes

References
 Yam, K. L., "Encyclopedia of Packaging Technology", John Wiley & Sons, 2009, 

Containers
Food packaging